UH-232 ((+)-UH232) is a drug which acts as a subtype selective mixed agonist-antagonist for dopamine receptors, acting as a weak partial agonist at the D3 subtype, and an antagonist at D2Sh autoreceptors on dopaminergic nerve terminals. This causes dopamine release in the brain and has a stimulant effect, as well as blocking the behavioural effects of cocaine. It may also serve as a 5-HT2A receptor agonist, based on animal studies.
It was investigated in clinical trials for the treatment of schizophrenia, but unexpectedly caused symptoms to become worse.

(+)-AJ76
The N-monopropyl derivative (+)-AJ76 is an active metabolite of UH-232 and has practically identical effects.

See also 
 7-OH-DPAT
 Amisulpride
 RDS-127
 PNU-99,194
 Rotigotine
 UH-301

References 

Stimulants
Phenol ethers
Aminotetralins
Dopamine antagonists
Dopamine agonists